Snooker world rankings 1986/1987: The professional world rankings for the top 64 snooker players in the 1986–87 season are listed below.

References

1986
Rankings 1987
Rankings 1986